William Eyre (died 1764) was an officer in the British Army during the French and Indian Wars.

Early life

Eyre served in the Royal Engineers during the Jacobite rising of 1745 and the War of the Austrian Succession.

North America
Eyre came to North America in 1755 as a captain in 44th Foot. He was sent by General Edward Braddock to support to attend General William Johnson as military Engineer upon his expedition to erect Forts on the Hudson, at the foot of Lake George, and at Crown-Point. He was also made quartermaster general and director of artillery for the campaign, making three roles he filled as the only British regular officer in the otherwise American colonial militia and Mohawk Indian army of General Johnson. Eyre's planned Fort Lyman – later renamed Fort Edward – under orders from General Phineas Lyman.

During the Battle of Lake George he commanded the artillery that defeated repeated French attacks. After the battle he planned and led the construction of Fort William Henry, becoming its first commandant. In 1757 he left the command to George Monro when the 35th Foot relieved the 44th. During the Battle of Carillon (also known as the 1758 Battle of Ticonderoga) he was wounded leading his 888-men strong regiment during the failed attacks to take the French fort. He was later in charge of the rebuilding of Fort Ticonderoga.  Having been promoted to Major in the 44th in 1756, he became an Engineer in Ordinary in 1758 and Chief Engineer of the Army and Lieutenant-Colonel in his regiment in 1759.

Death
Eyre drowned off the English coast in November 1764 on his way home.

References

1764 deaths
British Army personnel of the French and Indian War
44th Regiment of Foot officers
People who died at sea
British Army personnel of the Jacobite rising of 1745
British Army personnel of the War of the Austrian Succession